Branislav Hronec (22 December 1940 – 25 October 2022) was a Slovak composer, pianist and conductor.

Life and career 
Born in Hronsek, the son of an evangelical minister, Hronec started playing organ at 13 years old.

After experiences with the ensembles West Coast Combo and Bratislava Jazz Studio, in 1963 he founded the Braň Hronec Group, which later was renamed Braň Hronec Orchestra; with this ensemble he toured extensively nationally and abroad, in Europe, Central Asia and Cuba. The orchestra disbanded in 1981, with Hronec focusing on composition for television and theatre, and becoming in the second half of the 1980s music director at Slovak Radio and conductor of the Dance Orchestra of the Czechoslovak Television.

Hronec composed over 300 songs and compositions, including the first big beat song, the first twist song and the first disco song produced in Czechoslovakia. He often collaborated with lyricist Milan Lasica. Between 1990 and 1997 he was professor at the Academy of Performing Arts. He died on 25 October 2022 at the age of 81. He was married to the actress Judita Varga since 1980.

References

External links  
 
  
 

1940 births
2022 deaths 
People from Banská Bystrica District
Slovak composers
Slovak conductors (music)
Slovak pianists
Academy of Performing Arts in Bratislava alumni
Academic staff of the Academy of Performing Arts in Bratislava